Sombreffe Castle is a medieval castle in Sombreffe, province of Namur, Wallonia, Belgium.

See also
 List of castles in Belgium
 List of protected heritage sites in Sombreffe

External links
 
photos and description of Sombreffe castle, www.castles.nl

Wallonia's Major Heritage
Castles in Belgium
Castles in Namur (province)